Abu'l-Fadl al-Bal'ami, also known as Bal'ami the Elder (died November 14, 940), was a Samanid statesman from the al-Bal'ami family, who served as the vizier of Nasr II from 922 to 938.

Biography
Bal'ami is first mentioned as serving under the Samanid ruler Isma'il ibn Ahmad, and was later appointed as vizier by the latter's grandson, Nasr II. Just after Bal'ami had become the vizier of the Samanid Empire, the Zaydids invaded Khorasan, but were defeated by Bal'ami and the Simjurid general Simjur al-Dawati.

In 929, Nasr had his commander Muhammad ibn Ilyas imprisoned after being angered by him. Muhammad ibn Ilyas was, however, shortly freed after receiving the support of Bal'ami and was sent on a campaign in Gurgan. In 930 a revolt by Nasr's brothers broke out. They proclaimed one of their own, Yahya, as amir. Bal’ami managed to quell the rebellion by turning the brothers against each other. In 933, Bal'ami, along with Simjur al-Dawati, fought against the Dailamite military leader Makan ibn Kaki. In 938, Bal'ami was succeeded by Abu Ali Jayhani. After that, not much more is known about Bal'ami; he died on November 14, 940. He had a son named Amriak Bal'ami, who later also served as vizier of the Samanid Empire.

Legacy
Iranica says the following about him:

References

Sources 
C. E. Bosworth "Bal'ami, Abu'l-Fazl Mohammad." Encyclopedia Iranica. 23 January 2014. <http://www.iranicaonline.org/articles/balami-abul-fazl-mohammad-b>
 

940 deaths
Year of birth unknown
10th-century Iranian politicians
Samanid viziers
Bal'ami family